Susan Jean Maroney  (born 15 November 1974) is an Australian former marathon swimmer.

In 2019, Maroney competed in the sixth season of Australian Survivor. She was eliminated on Day 7 and finished in 22nd place.

Swimming career
Maroney was born with cerebral palsy. She initially kept her condition secret, but in 2007 she and her mother Pauline revealed her condition on the TV talk show Enough Rope. She was four years old when she started swimming, and by the time she was seven years old she was competing in swimming carnivals. Before that she only competed in short-distance events. After turning 13 years old she came to realise that she could do long swims. After failing to graduate from high school she pursued her vocation.

She was first recognised as a long-distance swimmer in 1989 when she achieved third place in the Australian Marathon Swimming Championship for Women, aged 14. In 1990 she became the first person to swim from Manly, New South Wales to Darling Harbour and back again in seven hours. That same year she also broke the speed record for swimming the English Channel, with the help of her mentor Des Renford.

In 1999, Maroney was admitted to hospital after having a severe asthma attack following a 675 lap swim for charity. Shortly after that she was arrested for driving under the influence, and although the charge was upheld, no conviction was recorded. She later admitted she had had a mental breakdown at that time, and was treated for exhaustion. She retired from swimming on 23 February 2003, officially ending her career by swimming from the Sydney Opera House to Manly.

Honours and awards
In 1989, 1990 and 1991, Maroney was awarded the Advance Australia Award. In 1991 she was awarded the Channel 10 Young Achievers Sport Award and in 1993 the Order of Australia Medal. She also received the Outstanding Achievement Award from the New South Wales Government in 1997; the same year she was inducted into the International Hall of Fame for her accomplishments. In 1996 she was awarded the Victorian Young Achiever of the Year, by the Asthma Foundation.

Achievements
 Three time winner of the Manhattan Island swim race in years 1991, 1992 and 1994.
 Fastest female two way English Channel Crossing (England/France/England) in 1991 at age 17 in time of 17 h 14 min.
 At age 22, the first person to swim the  Florida Straits from Cuba to the United States (12 May 1997).
 Swam a record  from Mexico to Cuba, covering the longest distance at the time swum without flippers in open sea, in 38 hours and 33 minutes (1 June 1998). The longest distance ever swum without flippers in open sea is 225 km (139.8 miles) by Croatian Veljko Rogosic across the Adriatic Sea from Grado to Riccione (both Italy) from 29 to 31 August 2006. The attempt took him 50 hours 10 mins. The distance swum is by GPS.
 Completed 160 km swim from Jamaica to Cuba (15 September 1999). During Hurricane Floyd, a category 4 hurricane.

Personal life
Susie Maroney is the daughter of Norm Maroney, former Assistant Commissioner of New South Wales Police. Her brother Michael is a former police officer and a junior triathlon champion. Her twin brother  Sean, also a triathlete, died in 2002 after falling from a balcony in Honolulu.

She gave birth to a daughter, Paris Seana Maroney, on 19 June 2008. The baby's father, Maroney's estranged husband Robert Daniels, engaged a solicitor to legally challenge her name because it excluded his surname.

Maroney later married Darren May, a furniture maker. She gave birth to a daughter, named Capri, on 1 September 2010. Maroney and May separated when Maroney was pregnant with his second child.

In November 2016, Susie married Perry Cross, a former rugby union footballer and a quadriplegic since the age of 19, after an injury caused by a tackle during a Queensland Rugby Union trial.  They separated after about a year.

On 22 February 2016, it was revealed in New Idea magazine that she had been diagnosed with melanoma.

References

External links
 nesher.com.au: Susie
Manhattan Island Foundation, bio 
The Competitive Ocean, ABC Radio National, The Sports Factor,  5 June 1998 
Australia Day Awards 2005 Guest Speaker, Huon Valley Council

1974 births
Living people
English Channel swimmers
Australian female swimmers
Australian long-distance swimmers
Recipients of the Medal of the Order of Australia
Swimmers with cerebral palsy
Australian disabled sportspeople
People from the Sutherland Shire
Sportswomen from New South Wales
Swimmers from Sydney
Australian Survivor contestants
Manhattan Island swimmers